The Pantheon of Heroes (a.k.a. the Pantheon of Super Heroes) is a 30th-century superhero team based on the Legion of Super-Heroes (former Legion artist, Dave Cockrum, drew the cover for the Pantheon's first story) and was introduced in Big Bang Comics. Pantheon of Heroes first appeared in Big Bang #s 12, 14 and 18 – the “TimeBomber Saga” guest-starring Erik Larsen’s Savage Dragon. Mark Lewis, the man responsible for so many Big Bang logos designed a few of the earliest characters, and the slightly later Butterfly Queen.

Fictional team history
The Pantheon is a team in the 30th century, inspired by Ultragirl and based in Ultiman's hometown- Empire City. Their Head-Quarters was a space craft and later a citadel. Each year, they have had auditions for new members. They have had time traveling technology (first "Time Pills" than "Time Belts"). This allowed Ultragirl to join the group. She later came to the group via "time cube".

Members
 Angelfish-
 Anti-Matter Lad- He is based on Wildfire and Mano.
 Brain Boy- He has superhuman intelligence (hence his over-sized head). He is based on Brainiac 5 and Evolvo Lad
 Butterfly Queen- She is based on Insect Queen.
 Clone Boy- Dubba has pale blue-skin and antennae. He can clone himself and others. He is based on Chameleon Boy, Duplicate Boy, Duo Damsel and Brainiac 5.
 Devil Boy- He can contact the dead via holding a seance. He is mentioned but not seen.
 Dragon Fist- Formerly Combat Kid, he is a martial artist. He is based on Karate Kid and Iron Fist.
 Galactic Lad- Noa Zark is able to increase his super strength to "level 10". He is based on Ultra Boy.
 Golden Girl-
 Ghost Girl- Mariah Vesper was first able to project her "soul-self". Then, after being blasted with a ray gun, she is denied entrance into the afterlife. She becomes undead, and is intangible. She is based on Phantom Girl, Deadman, Duo Damsel and Doctor Strange.
 Gravity Girl- She can manipulate weight and density. She is based on Star Boy and Light Lass.
 Jupiter Boy- He is a "cathode giant" with electric powers. He was a founding member and died saving the universe. He declared his love for Ultragirl with his last breath. He has a live-size gold statue in the Pantheon's "Hall of Heroes". He is based on Mon-El, Superboy and Lightning Lad.
 Kid Warlock- Has magical powers. 
 Laughing Boy- Shemp Babbit has emotion manipulation, but when he does so he gets the appropriate facial expression. He is the Phaethon's "class clown". He is based on Psycho-Pirate and Psyche.
 Nature Boy- He is an ally that said to have died in 2988. It's unknown that he actually became a member. He is based on Chlorophyll Kid.
 Photon- She was first known as "Lamp Lass".
 Snowstar- She has cold manipulation usually manifested as blizzards. She is based on Polar Boy (but looks similar to Phantom Girl).
 Tele-Girl- She is a mind-reading member that once visited the 20th century. She is based on Saturn Girl.
 Ultragirl- Thanks to being exposed to a radioactive meteor, she gained Ultraman-like powers. She was the inspiration for the group. She is based on Superboy and Supergirl.

References
1. http://www.internationalhero.co.uk/p/pantheonheroes.htm

Big Bang Comics
Superhero teams